Charles McDowell may refer to:

Charles McDowell (North Carolina militiaman) (1743–1815), American Revolutionary War general and politician
Charles McDowell Jr. (journalist) (1926–2010), political writer and columnist
Charles S. McDowell (Charles Samuel McDowell Jr., 1871–1943), interim governor of Alabama
Charles T. McDowell (1921–2007), professor at the University of Texas at Arlington
Charlie McDowell (1983–), film director and screenwriter

See also
Charles McDowall (1862–1916), Australian politician